The following highways are numbered 96:

Australia 
  Buntine Highway
  D'Aguilar Highway (Queensland State Highway) Kingaroy to Nanango section

Canada 
  Winnipeg Route 96
  Ontario Highway 96 (former)

Germany 
  Bundesstraße 96
  Bundesstraße 96a

Iran 
 Road 96

Korea, South 
 Gukjido 96

New Zealand 
  New Zealand State Highway 96

Poland 
  National road 96 (DK96)

United States 
  Interstate 96
  U.S. Route 96
  U.S. Route 96 (1926) (former)
  Alabama State Route 96
  Arizona State Route 96
  Arkansas Highway 96
  California State Route 96
  Colorado State Highway 96
  Georgia State Route 96
  Illinois Route 96
  Iowa Highway 96
  K-96 (Kansas highway)
  Kentucky Route 96
  Louisiana Highway 96
  Maine State Route 96
  Maryland Route 96 (former)
  Massachusetts Route 96
  M-96 (Michigan highway)
  Minnesota State Highway 96
  County Road 96 (Dakota County, Minnesota)
  County Road 96 (Ramsey County, Minnesota)
  Missouri Route 96
 Missouri Route 96 (1922) (former proposal)
 Missouri Route 96 (1929) (former)
  Nebraska Highway 96
  County Route 96 (Bergen County, New Jersey)
  New Mexico State Road 96
  New York State Route 96
  New York State Route 96A
  New York State Route 96B
  County Route 96 (Broome County, New York)
  County Route 96 (Cattaraugus County, New York)
  County Route 96 (Cayuga County, New York)
  County Route 96 (Dutchess County, New York)
  County Route 96 (Erie County, New York)
  County Route 96 (Herkimer County, New York)
  County Route 96 (Jefferson County, New York)
  County Route 96 (Madison County, New York)
  County Route 96 (Montgomery County, New York)
  County Route 96 (Niagara County, New York)
  County Route 96 (Rensselaer County, New York)
  County Route 96 (Saratoga County, New York)
  County Route 96 (Schenectady County, New York)
  County Route 96 (Suffolk County, New York)
  North Carolina Highway 96
  Ohio State Route 96
  Oklahoma State Highway 96
  Pennsylvania Route 96
  Rhode Island Route 96
  South Carolina Highway 96 (pre-1937) (former)
  Tennessee State Route 96
  Texas State Highway 96
  Texas State Highway Loop 96
  Farm to Market Road 96
  Utah State Route 96
  Virginia State Route 96
  Washington State Route 96
  Wisconsin Highway 96
  Wyoming Highway 96

See also 
A96
B96
M96 motorway
N96
P96
London Buses route 96
OC Transpo Route 96, a bus rapid transit route in Ottawa, Ontario
Melbourne tram route 96